GLCC may refer to:

Good Life China Corporation
Great Lakes Chemical Corporation
Great Lakes Christian College
Gas Light and Coke Company